Ximo is a common Spanish name or nickname which is a shortening of Joaquín, and may refer to:

Ximo Enguix, a Spanish retired footballer
Ximo Forner, a Spanish footballer
Ximo Miralles, a Spanish footballer
Joaquín Navarro Jiménez, known as Ximo Navarro, a Spanish footballer
Ximo Navarro, a Spanish footballer
Ximo Puig, a Spanish politician
Ximo Tebar, a Spanish musician